Richardson Square Mall (1977-2006) was an enclosed single-level shopping center located in Richardson, Texas on Plano Road, stretching between the intersections of Belt Line Road and Spring Valley Road. The three adjacent corners of Belt Line and Plano Road were also occupied by shopping centers. The mall attached to an existing Sears, which served as an anchor store and remained in business after Richardson Square Mall was demolished in June 2007.

Now located in its place is an outdoor retail center that goes by the name Richardson Square.

History
The 139,000 square foot Sears building opened on March 6, 1974, before the mall existed, and operated as a standalone store. Richardson Square Mall opened in 1977 along Plano Road with Sears being one of the four anchors in addition to Montgomery Ward, Dillard's, and Titche-Goettinger (which became Joske's in 1979). While the mall, Sears, and Montgomery Ward, were single-level, the other two anchor locations were each two stories.

During its peak in the 1980s, the mall included the Richardson Square I-II-III movie theater (owned by General Cinema), a video arcade across from it, two bookstores (Waldenbooks and B. Dalton), and two music stores (Musicland and Camelot Music). Food vendors were grouped in the entrance corridors at each end of the mall–by Sears and Montgomery Ward–and included Chick-fil-A, Orange Julius, Hot Sam Pretzels, Bresler's Ice Cream, and Karmelkorn.

The mall was closed on Sundays until September 1, 1985, when the Texas blue law was repealed.

In 1981, the much larger Collin Creek Mall opened in nearby Plano, but Richardson Square continued to be popular and fully occupied throughout the remainder of the 1980s. A free-standing strip of stores was built in 1984–85 on the outer corner of the property closest to Lloyd V. Berkner High School. Tenants included a realtor and dry cleaning business, but most of the stores were never leased.

In 1987, the Joske's chain was purchased by Dillard's, and the Joske's location in the mall became a second Dillard's. Dillard's maintained both its store and the former Joske's location, which it would close in 1995.

Decline
Stores began rapidly closing in the early 1990s.  By 1993, the property was at about 60% occupancy.  A new tenant during this phase was French bakery Cafe Partier.

In 1998, the mall was remodeled, with many new tenants and a food court added, as well as a Barnes & Noble bookstore which occupied the space of half a dozen stores.  The entrance corridor near Sears, formerly occupied by a movie theater, video arcade, and several food vendors, became a Stein Mart.  Shortly thereafter Montgomery Ward filed for bankruptcy and closed its stores.  The former Ward's pad was demolished and converted into a Super Target in 2002.  Stein Mart, Oshman's, and several other small stores soon closed as well.  The mall continued to operate until Garland's Firewheel Town Center opened in 2005. Dillard's, Old Navy, and Barnes & Noble all relocated to Firewheel.

In 2006, with the announcement that the mall would be demolished and Simon Properties would be renovating the site, city leaders expressed optimism that the new development would flourish.
Richardson Square Mall was demolished in mid 2007, except for Sears, which remained in operation as part of the subsequent Richardson Square retail center.

Richardson Square
The retail center includes Super Target with a Starbucks and Ross Dress for Less, Shoe Carnival, and a Lowe's home improvement store and pad sites such as Panda Express, Chick-fil-A, Whataburger, Sonic Drive-In, and Bank of America.

On December 28, 2018, it was announced that Sears would be closing as part of a plan to close 80 stores nationwide. The store closed on March 10, 2019.

New additions to the current Richardson Square include El Pollo Loco, Chipotle Mexican Grill, and Jason's Deli.  Additionally, there are two triplexes.  One includes Spectrum, Blaze Pizza, and one unoccupied space. The other includes Starbucks, Jersey Mike's, and Aspen Dental.

References

External links
Photos of Richardson Square Mall just prior to and during demolition.

Demolished shopping malls in the United States
Shopping malls established in 1977
Shopping malls in the Dallas–Fort Worth metroplex
Richardson, Texas
1977 establishments in Texas
2007 disestablishments in Texas
Buildings and structures demolished in 2007
Demolished buildings and structures in Texas